Benjamin Knight (October 16, 1836 - June 2, 1905) served in the California State Senate for the 6th district from 1883 to 1887. During the American Civil War, he joined Company I, 1st Massachusetts Cavalry Regiment of the Union Army, and served twenty-one months, where he became a corporal.

References

1836 births
1905 deaths
Place of death missing
Union Army non-commissioned officers
19th-century American politicians
Democratic Party California state senators
People from Mansfield, Connecticut